Dr. Claude Vivian Joseph Bryan (23 December 1892 – 10 March 1960) was an Australian rules footballer who played with University and Melbourne in the Victorian Football League (VFL). He played with Cananore in the TFL both before and after his VFL career. Bryan also represented Tasmania at the 1911 Adelaide Carnival.

References

Holmesby, Russell & Main, Jim (2007). The Encyclopedia of AFL Footballers. 7th ed. Melbourne: Bas Publishing.

External links

DemonWiki profile

1892 births
Australian rules footballers from Hobart
University Football Club players
Melbourne Football Club players
Cananore Football Club players
Australian military personnel of World War I
1960 deaths
Military personnel from Tasmania